DCII may refer to:

 Douglas DC-2
 602, year in Roman numerals
 The number 602 in Roman numerals.
 Da Capo II
 DigiCipher 2
 An abbreviation for the DirectCU II cooling system from Asus

 See also
 DC2 (disambiguation)